Karl Williams (born April 10, 1971 in Albion, Michigan) is an American former football player. He was a successful wide receiver and punt/kick returner who played professional football for the Tampa Bay Buccaneers and the Arizona Cardinals in the National Football League; as well as the Tampa Bay Storm in the Arena Football League. Signed by Tampa Bay as an undrafted free agent out of small school Texas A&M-Kingsville; Karl Williams retired as the all-time Buccaneers leader in punt return yardage (2,565) and punt return touchdowns (5) across 8 seasons with the club; records that still stand today.

Despite Williams' success in the NFL, he said, “From the first time I stepped on a football field, everybody told me I couldn't do it.  It seems like every year I found a way to prove everybody wrong. If you say I can't do it I'm going to prove you wrong.” Williams overcame playing college ball at a virtually unknown school (Texas A&M Kingsville), a small frame (5 foot 10, 177 pounds), and going undrafted by NFL teams.

Tampa Bay Buccaneers head coach Tony Dungy brought him on as an undrafted free agent in 1996. Williams said about these early years in the NFL, “I remember those last phone calls when they were making the final cuts my rookie year.  It was me and Jeff Gooch, and we were sitting around waiting for that phone call. We called it the Grim Reaper. Everyone was packing up and getting ready to go home and we were still waiting. Then they came around and said ‘Did you get the call? No? Then you're good.’  I remember Jeff and I just falling back and saying, ‘Yeah!’”

As an NFL rookie he established himself as Tampa Bay’s primary kick and punt return man by the end of the season. He earned the NFC’s Special Team’s Player of the Month award for December that first year in 1996.

Williams parlayed his success as a return man into more reps as a wide-receiver.  His 1997 campaign was his best ever at wideout; he achieved 486 receiving yards and 4 touchdowns in that role. Williams also continued to be a successful punt return specialist, and was picked as a candidate to end the Bucs’ kickoff-return drought. The team had never returned a kick for a touchdown in its 30-year history. However, the majority of Williams' success concerned return punts and not on kickoffs; and the team would not return a kick until Micheal Spurlock did so in 2007.

Although he was not successful at kickoffs, Williams scored with some regularity as a punt-returner, recording one touchdown each in the 1996 and 1997 seasons as well as one each year from 2000 to 2002.

At the end of the 2002 season he achieved the game's highest honor by becoming a Super Bowl Champion. A member of the first championship Tampa Bay squad; Williams’ Bucs were led by Hall of Famers linebacker Derrick Brooks and defensive tackle Warren Sapp on defense, and game-manager quarterback Brad Johnson on offense.  Behind head coach Jon Gruden, the Buccaneers went 12-4 during the regular season, defeated their chief rivals the Philadelphia Eagles in the NFC Championship game, and dominated the Super Bowl against the Oakland Raiders, winning 48-21 to bring the Lombardi Trophy to the Tampa Bay area.

Williams left Tampa Bay after the following season and signed with the Arizona Cardinals, playing one year in the desert before leaving the NFL for good at the end of the 2004 season.

Williams also remains a fan favorite in the Tampa Bay area. Part of the source of his popularity can be found in his nickname, “The Truth.” He got his nickname largely because it was the nickname of journeyman boxer of the 1980s and 1990s Carl Williams. He was most famous for going toe to toe with some of boxing's best including Larry Holmes (who Williams lost a controversial decision to) and to Mike Tyson.

Like the boxer, he achieved despite his humble beginnings, his modest college, and his undrafted status to achieve greatness at football's highest level. Williams has earned a Super Bowl Ring n On his career as a punt returner Williams has said “That's being a ballplayer. Everyone talks about me as a punt returner, and they made me a punt returner in my rookie year because that was the only way I could get on the field.”

His rags to riches story has led to Williams’ ownership of a small gym in Texas, where he encourages the youth of his alma mater that everyone can be successful. He is now teaching the determination and willingness to do whatever it takes that he embraced so well as a player. When asked the truth about him, old coach Jon Gruden said about Karl Williams, “He's a humble guy, a guy who's worked for everything he has and that's one of the winning edges he brings to our football team and something I really appreciate about him.”

His cousin, Mondray Gee, is an assistant coach in the NFL.

References 

1971 births
Living people
Garland High School alumni
People from Garland, Texas
Sportspeople from Battle Creek, Michigan
People from Albion, Michigan
Players of American football from Michigan
American football wide receivers
American football return specialists
Tyler Apaches football players
Texas A&M–Kingsville Javelinas football players
Arizona Cardinals players
Tampa Bay Buccaneers players